Jabal Shams or Jebel Shams is a mountain located in northeastern Oman north of Al Hamra town. It is known as Jabal Shams because it is the first place to receive sunrise in Oman due to its high peak. It is the highest mountain of the Hajar range and the country. Jabal Shams also hosts Al Nakhur Canyon which is labeled as the Grand Canyon of Arabia. Nearby is Jabal Akhdar, another prominent peak in the region.

Summits
The highest point of the mountain is the North Summit, which is occupied by a military base and is a restricted area.

The mountain also has a second summit, the South Summit, which is publicly accessible for trekking via the W4 Trail, marked by the Oman Ministry of Tourism.

Gallery

See also
 Tourism in Oman

References

External links
 Travel Blog on Jebel Shams
 http://www.enhg.org/field/jshams04/jshams04.htm 
 Flickr Images
 https://web.archive.org/web/20081005065647/http://www.geocities.com/evertinoman/shams.htm

Shams
Highest points of countries
Two-thousanders of Asia
Al Hajar Mountains